The Territorial Assembly of Wallis and Futuna (French: Assemblée Territoriale; Wallisian and Futunan: Fono fakatelituale) is the legislature of Wallis and Futuna. It consists of 20 members, elected for a five-year term by proportional representation in multi-seat constituencies. The Assembly sits in Mata Utu, the capital of the territory.

History
The Assembly was established by article 11 of the 1961 statute which established Wallis and Futuna as an overseas territory.

Elections
The territorial assembly consists of 20 members, elected for a five-year term by proportional representation in multi-seat constituencies. ʻUvea has 13 seats — 6 for the Mua District, 4 for the Hahake District, and 3 for the Hihifo District. Futuna has 7 seats, 4 for the Alo District and 3 for Sigave. The electoral system uses a closed list, with voters voting for a single party. The seats are distributed in each constituency using the highest averages method.

Latest election

Powers and procedures
The powers and competencies of the assembly are a modified version of those originally granted to the Congress of New Caledonia. It meets twice a year with an administrative session in the middle of the year and a budgetary session at the end of the year, for a maximum duration of 45 days each. Extraordinary sessions, not exceeding 15 days, can also take place. Debates can take place in French, Wallisian or Futunian. Interpreters are present and the reports can be written in the three languages.

Presidents of the Territorial Assembly
The assembly is headed by a president elected every year by its members after the opening of the budgetary session.

References

External links
 Official website

 
Government of Wallis and Futuna
Wallis and Futuna
Legislatures of Overseas France
Organizations based in Wallis and Futuna